Estadio Emiliano Ghezzi is a multi-use stadium in the neighborhood of Vista Alegre in Asunción, Paraguay. It is currently used mostly for football matches and is the home stadium of Club Fernando de la Mora. The stadium holds 8,000 people. 

Multi-purpose stadiums in Paraguay
Football venues in Asunción
Sports venues in Asunción
Estadio Emiliano Ghezzi